Skorpion is a British television serial transmitted by the BBC in 1983.

A sequel (of sorts) to the 1981 series Blood Money, Skorpion saw Michael Denison, Daniel Hill and Jack McKenzie reprise their roles from the original serial. A mysterious plane crash in the Scottish highlands and a woman pursued by a hitman are cases investigated by the Anti-Terrorism Squad.

Cast

 Terrence Hardiman - Chief Supt. Franks
 Michael Denison - Captain Aubrey Percival
 Marianne Borgo - Gabrielle
 Daniel Hill - Inspector Clark
 Jack McKenzie - Chief Inspector Perry
 Neville Jason - Constant Delangre
 Tamara Ustinov - WPC Baker
 Mary Wimbush - Agatha
 Ian Cullen - Inspector Hallisay
 James Kennedy - Mr. X
 Tom Chadbon - Dr. Ormiston

References

External links
 

1980s British drama television series
BBC television dramas
1983 British television series debuts
1983 British television series endings
British thriller television series
1980s British television miniseries
English-language television shows